Hrabětice is a municipality and village in Znojmo District in the South Moravian Region of the Czech Republic. It has about 900 inhabitants.

History
The first written mention of Hrabětice is from 1417.

Demographics

References

External links

Villages in Znojmo District